Park Chan-young (born November 7, 1986) is a South Korean footballer who plays in midfielder and striker for Deltras Sidoarjo.

References

External links 
 Profile at Goal.com
 Profile at Liga Indonesia Official Site
 

South Korean footballers
Living people
Persibo Bojonegoro players
Expatriate footballers in Indonesia
1986 births
Liga 1 (Indonesia) players
Association football midfielders